The LH engine was a series of V6 engines developed by Chrysler Corporation for its LH platform cars. It is a 60-degree V6 designed for front-wheel drive applications, later adapted to rear-wheel drive ones. The 2.7 liter LH engine is based on the SOHC 3.5 L engine, though bore spacing, cylinder bore, stroke, and assembly site are different.

2.7 L 
The  EER version debuted in 1998 and is built in Kenosha, Wisconsin. It is a DOHC 24-valve design. It is an aluminum block with cast-iron cylinder liners and aluminum heads. In terms of emissions, this was a TLEV engine; it runs on regular-octane (87) gasoline. Compression when launched in 1998 was 9.7:1 (increased to 9.9:1 in the LX cars). Redline occurred at 6,464 rpm, originally; and at 6,600 rpm as revised for the LX. The 24 valves are actuated by hydraulic end-pivot roller followers and hydraulic lifters. Fuel injection was sequential for six ports for all engines.

The 2.7 differed from the 3.5 liter engine from which it was derived in many ways. The Magnum version featured a variable intake system to create a supercharging effect at different engine speeds. A three-row chain replaced the timing belt of the 3.5 liter engine, and the 2.7 in the LX also has electronic throttle control and an enhancement to the intake manifold (described in greater detail below), the former to allow for the use of electronic stability control.

Chrysler claimed that part-throttle torque was increased by up to 10% in the primary driving range, 2100–3400 rpm.

 1998–2001 Chrysler 300M (Europe)
 1998–2004 Chrysler Concorde
 1998–2004 Dodge Intrepid/Chrysler Intrepid
 2001–2006 Dodge Stratus sedan
 2001–2010 Chrysler Sebring convertible and sedan
 2005–2008 Dodge Magnum SE
 2005–2010 Chrysler 300
 2006–2010 Dodge Charger SE (Initially, only fleet models received the 2.7 L in 2006)
 2008–2010 Dodge Avenger
 2009–2010 Dodge Journey (non-US markets)

Oil sludge and other known problems 
Buildup of oil sludge is a common issue that plagues this engine. Higher than average operating temperature, an insufficient oil capacity and the timing chain driven water pump leaking into the crankcase are all factors in why this occurs . The 2.7 L V6 engines have suffered from oil sludge contamination. In February 2009, five separate class action lawsuits related to the alleged oil sludge defect were consolidated to the District of New Jersey. During the Chrysler bankruptcy proceedings, there was concern among consumer advocate groups that Chrysler's proposed "free and clear" sale of assets to "New Chrysler" would allow the automaker to avoid liability for the oil sludge defect.

The engine was affected by an oil sludge problem and premature timing chain tensioner failure. The oil sludge issue appears to have been caused by issues with the crankcase ventilation system, and while it affected a minority of engines, it could cause complete failure In some cases, neglected maintenance aided in premature failure (missed oil changes or increased intervals between oil changes). Also this engine was plagued with issues regarding the water pump gasket leaking coolant internally and diluting the oil. Such coolant leaks must be addressed instantly or engine failure is imminent.

See also 
 List of Chrysler engines
 Chrysler LH platform

References

External links 
 Allpar's page on the 2.7 L V6

LH
V6 engines
Gasoline engines by model